Mughan District was one of the historical-geographical and administrative territories.

History 
The Mughan district was present in Sabirabad and Saatly Districts.
The district governor was Hasan Khan.

Population 

In 1821, one fortress (Qalaqayın) and 44 hamlets (some of which are known as Bildik, Ulucali-Khalphali, Mammishli, Kurkandi, Jangan, First Ranjbars, Murids, Second Ranjbars, Garagli, Minbashi, Molla Vaizli, Damamayagali, Ali Sultanli, Şahadlı, Gushtan, Molday, Mustafabeyli, Hashimkhanli, Potular) hosted 500 families.

Economy 
The residents of the Mughan district were engaged in agriculture, cattle breeding and cotton.

Source 
  Описание Ширванской провинции, составленное в 1820 году, по распоряжению главноуправляющего в Грузии А.П.Ермолова, генерал-майором Мадатовым и действительным статским советником Могилевским. — Тифлис: типография Главного Управления наместника Кавказского, 1867. — Number of pages:  287.

Also see 
 Rudbar district
 Cavad

References 

Shirvan Khanate